is a former Japanese football player, kickboxing player and musician.

Playing career
Yano was born in Accra, Ghana on January 22, 1979. He moved to Japan when he was 10 years old. He joined newly was promoted to J1 League club, Vissel Kobe from Shimizu S-Pulse youth team in 1997. Although he played many matches as forward in 1997, he could hardly play in the match in 1998. After 1 year blank, he joined newly was promoted to J2 League club, Mito HollyHock in 2000. In 2001, he moved to J2 club Sagan Tosu. He retired end of 2001 season.

After retirement
After retirement, he became a kickboxing player and musician. He has also written songs for artists such as 2PM and AAA.

Club statistics

References

External links

1979 births
Living people
Sportspeople from Accra
Japanese footballers
Japanese people of Ghanaian descent
Sportspeople of Ghanaian descent
J1 League players
J2 League players
Vissel Kobe players
Mito HollyHock players
Sagan Tosu players
Association football forwards